Nikolai Ivanovich Tishchenko (born 10 December 1926 in Lyublino; died 10 May 1981 in Moscow) was a Soviet football player.

Honours
 Olympic champion: 1956.
 Soviet Top League winner: 1952, 1953, 1956, 1958.
 Soviet Top League runner-up: 1954, 1955.
 Soviet Top League bronze: 1957.
 Season-end Top 33 players list: 1957.

International career
Tishchenko made his debut for USSR on 8 September 1954 in a friendly against Sweden. During the 1956 Olympics semifinal against Bulgaria he broke his clavicle, the substitutions were not yet allowed, so he stayed on the field, finishing the game.

References

External links
  Profile

1926 births
1981 deaths
Russian footballers
Soviet footballers
Soviet Union international footballers
Olympic footballers of the Soviet Union
Footballers at the 1956 Summer Olympics
Olympic gold medalists for the Soviet Union
Soviet Top League players
FC Spartak Moscow players
Olympic medalists in football
Medalists at the 1956 Summer Olympics
Association football defenders